Radio P2 may refer to:

DR P2, Danish radio station
NRK P2, Norwegian radio station
Sveriges Radio P2, Swedish radio station

See also
P2 (disambiguation)